Otto Bolaños (born April 12, 1983 in Bogota) is a Colombian professional vert skater. Bolanos started skating when he was thirteen years old in 1996 and turned professional in 2004. Bolanos has attended many competitions in his vert skating career.

Best tricks: Double Backflip

Vert competitions 
2007 LG Action Sports World Championships, Dallas, TX - Vert: 6th
2007 Action Sports World Tour, San Diego, CA - Vert: 8th
2007 Asian X Games, Shanghai - Vert: 7th
2005 Italian Rolling Contest - Vert: 1st
2005 Best Trick Rennes sur Roulettes - Vert: 1st
2004 Latin American X  Games - Vert: 5th

References

External links
kiaxgamesasia.com
actionsportstour.com
rollerenligne.com
ottobolanos.com
rollingsetgo.com
rollernews.com
rollernews.com

1983 births
Living people
Vert skaters
X Games athletes